Art Linson is an American producer, screenwriter, and author.

Life and career
Art Linson has produced movies in every decade since the seventies including  Fight Club, Heat, The Untouchables, Fast Times at Ridgemont High, Into the Wild, and Melvin and Howard. 

Linson was an executive producer on the long-running FX television series Sons of Anarchy (2008-2014), as well as Yellowstone, starring Kevin Costner. Yellowstone premiered on June 20, 2018, on the Paramount Network. Yellowstone has become the most popular scripted series in television. Linson is an executive producer on the tv series 1883 , and 1923.

He is the author of two books A Pound of Flesh: Perilous Tales of How to Produce Movies in Hollywood(1998) and What Just Happened?: Bitter Hollywood Tales from the Front Line, the last of which was made into a major motion picture starring Robert De Niro directed by Barry Levinson.  

Linson is married to British actress and writer Fiona Lewis.

Filmography
He was a producer in all films unless otherwise noted.

Film

As writer

As director

Thanks

Television

References

External links

1942 births
Living people
Film producers from Illinois
American film directors
American male screenwriters
Writers from Chicago
Screenwriters from Illinois